Kingsville Independent School District is a public school district based in Kingsville, Texas (USA).

In 2009 the school district was rated "academically acceptable" by the Texas Education Agency.

Schools

High School (Grades 9-12)
 Henrietta M. King Early College High School

Middle School (Grades 7-8)
Memorial Middle School

Intermediate School (Grades 5-6)
Gillett Intermediate School

Elementary Schools (Grades PreK-4)
N.M. Harrel Elementary School
A.D. Harvey Elementary School
Alice G.K. Kleberg Elementary School
Jesus R. Perez Elementary School

References

External links
 

School districts in Kleberg County, Texas
Kingsville, Texas